Michael Cole (17 March 1933 – 4 August 2001) was a British writer. He created a number of children's programmes from the 1970s to the 1990s, including Alphabet Castle,  Heads and Tails and  Ragtime, for which he won a Society of Film and Television Award (later known as a BAFTA) for Best Children's Programme.
Together with his wife Joanne Cole, he created Bod, originally published as four books in 1965 and made into a TV show in the 1970s, as well as Fingerbobs and  Gran.

Life and work 
Michael Cole was born in Willesden, London on 17 March 1933. During the war he and his family were evacuated to Cheltenham where after junior school he went to Cheltenham College. He trained as an intelligence officer during national service in the army and was sent to Cambridge University to learn Russian. In 1959, he collaborated with  Halas and Batchelor writing for two series of animated shorts (Habatales) for ABC Weekend TV, including  The Cultured Ape  which was awarded best film in its category at the 1959 Venice Film Festival.

In 1964 Cole moved with his wife and two children to the South of France where they created the first Bod books which were published by Metheun in 1965. Two years later, and now with four children, Cole began working for BBC children's television, initially writing and directing for Play School. and Play Away. In 1972 Michael and Joanne Cole created  Fingerbobs, songs and stories with simple paper puppets and artwork by Joanne Cole. The show starred Rick Jones and was shown on BBC until 1984. In 1972, Cole wrote and directed  Ragtime a BBC studio programme with songs and sketches, featuring puppets by  Joanne Cole, illustrations by Quentin Blake and music by Peter Gosling. The programme won a Society of Film and Television Award (later known as a BAFTA)  in 1973 for Best Children's Programme  and was followed by a second series.

In 1975, Cole developed the four original Bod  books into a thirteen episode animated cartoon series for BBC. Narrated by John Le Mesurier and Maggie Henderson with music by Derek Griffiths, nine new stories were created which were later made into books. The films were animated by Alan Rogers and the programmes also featured Alberto Frog with artwork by Joanne Cole. Bod was broadcast on BBC until 1984. It was also shown in Australia, New Zealand, the Netherlands, Sweden, Finland, Norway, Poland and Israel. In the United States, Bod aired on Nickelodeon as part of the Pinwheel program.

Music and songwriting were always major parts of Cole's programmes and another collaboration with Derek Griffiths led to Heads and Tails in 1977. The show was made up of archive and specially shot footage of animals with humorous voices, songs and music by Griffiths. Songs from both Ragtime  and Heads and Tails were released as vinyl LPs.

In the early 1980s Cole wrote and directed two studio programmes for BBC, Bric-a-brac starring Brian Cant in a fictitious junk shop  and Chockablock featuring a big yellow computer and presented by Fred Harris and Carol Leader. He also worked with David Yates in creating Pigeon Street animated by Alan Rogers and Peter Lang. The 13 episodes featured everyday people and animals living on Pigeon street, including such characters as long distant lorry driver, Clara, with a song to match. It was shown on BBC from 1981 and repeated until 1994.

In 1982 Cole created Gran co-written with Joanne Cole. These tales of a most surprising grandmother, which were later developed into books, were animated by Ivor Wood (who had worked on the first series of Postman Pat ) and were narrated by Patricia Hayes.
In 1985, Cole's wife Joanne died of cancer aged 51. The same year Fingermouse was released, a musical version of Fingerbobs starring the paper mouse and other puppets, Joanne Cole's last work. In 1987, Cole wrote 26 episodes of Edward and Friends, a stop-motion animated Lego with narration by Bernard Cribbins. and created  Dot Stop for Playdays which aired on BBC from 1989-97.

In 1992, Cole married his second wife Pam and from 1993–95 wrote and produced three series of Alphabet Castle and Tinysaurs for Carlton TV.

In 2000, Cole started working on a new Bod book which he left unfinished before he died of cancer in 2001 at age 68. One year later, Bod's Way was published, written and illustrated by his children Alison and Laurence and based on Cole's original ideas.

TV shows 

Play School – 1967–88
Play Away – 1971–76
Fingerbobs –  1972
Ragtime – 1973
Bod – 1975 
 Heads and Tails – 1977
Bricabrac – 1980
Pigeon Street – 1981
Chockablock – 1981
Stop and Go – 1981
Gran – 1982
Fingermouse – 1985
Pie in the Sky – 1986
Playdays – 1988–1997
Alphabet Castle – 1993
Tinysaurs – 2000

Publications 
Bod's Apple - 1965
Bod's Present - 1965
Bod's Dream - 1965
Bod and the Cherry Tree - 1965
Wet Albert - 1967
Kate and Sam's Pet - 1971
Kate and Sam's Tea - 1971
Kate and Sam's New Home - 1971
Kate and Sam Go Out - 1971
The Baby and the Band - 1973
The Boot in the Field - 1973
Bod and Breakfast - 1977
Bod and the Dog - 1977
Bod and the Grasshopper - 1977
Bod's Kite - 1977
Bod and the Beach - 1977
Bod and the Cake - 1977
Bod and the Birds - 1977
Pigeon Street books - 1982
Gran books - 1985
Edward and Friends books - 1987
Head in the Sand - 1989

Theatre 
Cole worked with composer Paul Reade on a musical version of  Aesop's fables, A Feast of Fables, and the musical fairytale Cinderella, performed all over the UK.

Discography 
Ragtime -  lyrics by Michael Cole and music by Peter Gosling. BBC records, 1974.
 Heads and Tails - lyrics by Michael Cole and music by Derek Griffiths. BBC records,1980.
Fingerbobs - lyrics by Michael Cole and music by Michael Jessett, Trunk records 2011.

References

External links 

Bod website
Bod toonhound page
Here come the Coles
Here comes Bod 3D model

English television writers
British children's writers
People from Willesden
Writers from London
1933 births
2001 deaths
20th-century English screenwriters